Ludwig De Winter (born 31 December 1992 in La Louvière) is a Belgian former cyclist, who last rode for UCI WorldTeam . He turned professional in 2015, and achieved a ninth-place finish in Binche–Chimay–Binche that year. He was also part of the  team that helped Loïc Vliegen to victory in the 2019 Tour de Wallonie. An inhabitant of Binche, he retired at the age of 28 after the 2021 edition of Binche–Chimay–Binche.

Major results

2013
 9th Eschborn–Frankfurt Under–23
2014
 7th Circuit de Wallonie
 8th Grote Prijs Stad Zottegem
2015
 1st Mountains classification Tour de Wallonie
 9th Binche–Chimay–Binche
2016
 10th Schaal Sels
2017
 4th GP Paul Borremans Viane-Geraardsbergen
 6th Schaal Sels
 8th Grote Prijs Marcel Kint
 9th De Kustpijl
 10th Dwars door de Vlaamse Ardennen

References

External links

1992 births
Living people
Belgian male cyclists
People from La Louvière
Cyclists from Hainaut (province)